Carlo Marini (born 11 May 1972) is a Canadian former international soccer player, born in Vancouver, who participated at the 1991 CONCACAF Gold Cup. He made his international debut on 28 June 1991 against Honduras as a 28th-minute substitute for goalkeeper Craig Forrest, who was sent off. Marini conceded four goals and Canada lost the game by a 4–2 scoreline. He played for the Vancouver 86ers in the CSL from 1989 to 1990.

References

External links

1972 births
Living people
Soccer players from Vancouver
Canadian soccer players
Canadian people of Italian descent
Canada men's youth international soccer players
Canada men's international soccer players
1991 CONCACAF Gold Cup players
Canadian Soccer League (1987–1992) players
Vancouver Whitecaps (1986–2010) players
Association football goalkeepers